William Wilson DD (1545 – 15 May 1615) was a Canon of Windsor from 1584 to 1615 and Chancellor of St Paul's Cathedral from 1596 to 1615.

Career

He was educated at Merton College, Oxford and graduated BA in 1564, MA in 1570, BD in 1576 and DD in 1607.

He was appointed:
Rector of Islip, Oxford 1578
Chaplain to the Archbishop of Canterbury
Prebendary of Rochester 1591
Rector of Cliffe, Kent
Chancellor of St Paul's Cathedral 1596 - 1615
Prebendary of Ealdstreet in St Paul's 1615.

He was appointed to the third stall in St George's Chapel, Windsor Castle in 1584 and held the canonry until 1615.

Notes 

1545 births
1615 deaths
Canons of Windsor
Alumni of Merton College, Oxford